James "Jim" McGirr, JP (6 February 1890 – 27 October 1957) was the Labor Premier of New South Wales from 6 February 1947 to 3 April 1952.

A Catholic, McGirr was the seventh son of John Patrick McGirr, farmer and Irish immigrant, and Mary McGirr, whose maiden name was O'Sullivan. Born in Parkes, New South Wales, he grew up on a dairy farm near that town. Educated mostly at St Stanislaus College, Bathurst, he was later apprenticed to his brother Greg McGirr, a pharmacist at Parkes. He soon forfeited his apprenticeship to work in stockyards for a while, but had to give up that work when he was thrown from a horse and seriously injured.

Subsequently, he resumed his apprenticeship and attended the University of Sydney; he was registered as a pharmacist in 1913. Employed by Washington H. Soul Pattinson in Pitt Street, he later opened a pharmacy in Parkes, specialising in veterinarians' prescriptions. Later still, he operated pharmacies in partnership with his brother in two Sydney suburbs: Marrickville and Kings Cross.

Parliamentary career
McGirr followed his brothers Greg and Patrick into ALP politics and joined the Parkes branch of the party in 1906. In 1922, Greg vacated his seat as a member of the Legislative Assembly for Cootamundra, and stood successfully for a Sydney electorate. He managed to get Jim endorsement on the party ticket for Cootamundra and he was duly elected. Due to local party opposition in 1925, he was obliged to find another seat in 1925; and he successfully contested Cumberland in western Sydney. In 1927, proportional representation was abandoned and Cumberland was abolished. He then stood for Bankstown, which he held until 1950. From 1950 to 1952 he was the member for another western Sydney constituency, namely, Liverpool.

When the Lang Government came to power, McGirr became Minister for Health from November 1930 to June 1931. He was Minister for Local Government from June 1931 to May 1932 and became Minister for Transport in March 1932. On 13 May 1932, the Governor Sir Philip Game dismissed Lang and installed Bertram Stevens as Premier. The United Australia Party (UAP) won the subsequent election.

In October 1932 McGirr married Valerie Cecilia Armstrong. Lang continued to lead the New South Wales branch of the Labor Party, which had effectively seceded from the Federal Labor Party, when Lang's supporters sided with the UAP to bring down the Scullin Labor Government in November 1931. McGirr continued to be a loyal supporter of Lang throughout the 1930s, even though Lang Labor did not win any elections. When Lang left the party to found the Australian Labor Party (Non-Communist) in April 1940, McGirr and six other parliamentarians followed him. However, they returned to the Labor Party before the May 1941 election that brought William McKell's government to power.

McGirr became Minister for Local Government and Housing in the new Government, the only one of the ex-Langite faction appointed to Cabinet. He failed to make significant progress on local government amalgamation; but he did establish the Housing Commission of New South Wales, which became an important state body dealing with the post-World War II and post-Depression housing shortage. As a result, he was given sole responsibility for housing in 1944.

Premiership
In 1947, Prime Minister Ben Chifley named McKell as Governor-General of Australia, initiating a struggle between, on one side, Bob Heffron (supported by the Party Executive, McKell, many urban members, and many radical members) and, on the other side, McGirr (supported mainly by ex-Langite, rural and Catholic members). Eventually McGirr won by just two votes. He became Premier on his 57th birthday.

Decent, humane, well-liked, and personally free from corruption, McGirr as Premier was a great procrastinator, and delayed many proposals. Even after the ALP won the 1947 state election, McGirr proved unable to increase significantly the representation of his supporters in the Cabinet as a whole.

An ambitious public works program, which McGirr had promised in the 1947 campaign, was disrupted by post-war shortages and strikes. He also publicly threatened to resign because the party organisation had disendorsed four members of the Legislative Assembly for failing to follow the party's dictates in a vote for the Upper House. Subsequently, though, he withdrew his resignation threat, leaving him looking weak.

The 1950 election produced such a big anti-ALP swing that it left the government depending for its survival upon the votes of two of the disendorsed members, who had won their seats as independents. Consequently, McGirr had to deal with the independents as well as a cabinet full of factional opponents. On 2 April 1952, he resigned from the Premiership; Joseph Cahill succeeded him. He afterwards took up a controversial appointment as Chairman of the Maritime Services Board.

McGirr died of a coronary occlusion on 27 October 1957, at Homebush, inner-western Sydney. He was survived by his wife Valerie Cecilia, daughter Margaret, and two sons, Patrick and James. His niece Trixie Gardner became a Conservative politician in the United Kingdom and is the only Australian woman to have been made a life peeress of the UK parliament, as Baroness Gardner of Parkes.

Notes

 

1890 births
1957 deaths
Australian Roman Catholics
University of Sydney alumni
Members of the New South Wales Legislative Assembly
Premiers of New South Wales
Treasurers of New South Wales
Australian Labor Party members of the Parliament of New South Wales
20th-century Australian politicians
20th-century Australian businesspeople